Lasioglossum lionotum is a species of Lasioglossum in the Halictidae family.

References

Further reading

 

lionotum
Articles created by Qbugbot
Insects described in 1905